Alıbəyli or Alybeyli or Alibeili may refer to: 
Alıbəyli, Agdam, Azerbaijan
Alıbəyli, Kalbajar, Azerbaijan (formerly Tirkeşəvənd)
Alıbəyli, Zangilan, Azerbaijan
Alybeyli Vtoryye, Azerbaijan

See also
Əlibəyli (disambiguation)